A pyroclastic flow (also known as a pyroclastic density current or a pyroclastic cloud) is a fast-moving current of hot gas and volcanic matter (collectively known as tephra) that flows along the ground away from a volcano at average speeds of  but is capable of reaching speeds up to .

Pyroclastic flows are the most deadly of all volcanic hazards and are produced as a result of certain explosive eruptions; they normally touch the ground and hurtle downhill, or spread laterally under gravity. Their speed depends upon the density of the current, the volcanic output rate, and the gradient of the slope.

Origin of term

Pyroclastic flows that contain a much higher proportion of gas to rock are known as "fully dilute pyroclastic density currents" or pyroclastic surges. The lower density sometimes allows them to flow over higher topographic features or water such as ridges, hills, rivers and seas. Cold pyroclastic surges can occur when the eruption is from a vent under a shallow lake or the sea. Fronts of some pyroclastic density currents are fully dilute; for example, during the eruption of Mount Pelée in 1902, a fully dilute current overwhelmed the city of Saint-Pierre and killed nearly 30,000 people.

A pyroclastic flow is a type of gravity current; in scientific literature it is sometimes abbreviated to PDC (pyroclastic density current).

Causes

There are several mechanisms that can produce a pyroclastic flow:

 Fountain collapse of an eruption column from a Plinian eruption (e.g. Mount Vesuvius' destruction of Herculaneum and Pompeii in 79 AD). In such an eruption, the material forcefully ejected from the vent heats the surrounding air and the turbulent mixture rises, through convection, for many kilometers. If the erupted jet is unable to heat the surrounding air sufficiently, convection currents will not be strong enough to carry the plume upwards and it falls, flowing down the flanks of the volcano.
 Fountain collapse of an eruption column associated with a Vulcanian eruption (e.g., Montserrat's Soufrière Hills volcano has generated many of these deadly pyroclastic flows and surges). The gas and projectiles create a cloud that is denser than the surrounding air and becomes a pyroclastic flow.
 Frothing at the mouth of the vent during degassing of the erupted lava. This can lead to the production of a rock called ignimbrite. This occurred during the eruption of Novarupta in 1912.
 Gravitational collapse of a lava dome or spine, with subsequent avalanches and flows down a steep slope (e.g., Montserrat's Soufrière Hills volcano, which caused nineteen deaths in 1997).
 The directional blast (or jet) when part of a volcano collapses or explodes (e.g., the eruption of Mount St. Helens on May 18, 1980). As distance from the volcano increases, this rapidly transforms into a gravity-driven current.

Size and effects

Larger flows can travel for hundreds of kilometres, although none on that scale has occurred for several hundred thousand years. Flows usually consist of two parts: the basal flow hugs the ground and contains larger, coarse boulders and rock fragments, while an extremely hot ash plume lofts above it because of the turbulence between the flow and the overlying air, admixing and heating cold atmospheric air causing expansion and convection.

The kinetic energy of the moving cloud will flatten trees and buildings in its path. The hot gases and high speed make them particularly lethal, as they will incinerate living organisms instantaneously or turn them into carbonized fossils: 
 The cities of Pompeii and Herculaneum, Italy, for example, were engulfed by pyroclastic surges on August 24, 79 AD with many lives lost.
 The 1902 eruption of Mount Pelée destroyed the Martinique town of St. Pierre. Despite signs of impending eruption, the government deemed St. Pierre safe due to hills and valleys between it and the volcano, but the pyroclastic flow charred almost the entirety of the city, killing all but three of its 30,000 residents.
 A pyroclastic surge killed volcanologists Harry Glicken and Katia and Maurice Krafft and 40 other people on Mount Unzen, in Japan, on June 3, 1991.
 On June 25, 1997, a pyroclastic flow travelled down Mosquito Ghaut on the Caribbean island of Montserrat. A large, highly energized pyroclastic surge developed. This flow could not be restrained by the Ghaut and spilled out of it, killing 19 people who were in the Streatham village area (which was officially evacuated). Several others in the area suffered severe burns.

Interaction with water
Testimonial evidence from the 1883 eruption of Krakatoa, supported by experimental evidence, shows that pyroclastic flows can cross significant bodies of water. However, that might be a pyroclastic surge, not flow, because the density of a gravity current means it cannot move across the surface of water.

A 2006 BBC documentary film, Ten Things You Didn't Know About Volcanoes, demonstrated tests by a research team at Kiel University, Germany, of pyroclastic flows moving over water. When the reconstructed pyroclastic flow (stream of mostly hot ash with varying densities) hit the water, two things happened: the heavier material fell into the water, precipitating out from the pyroclastic flow and into the liquid; the temperature of the ash caused the water to evaporate, propelling the pyroclastic flow (now only consisting of the lighter material) along on a bed of steam at an even faster pace than before.

These show the water boiling as the flow passed over it. Another example was observed in 2019 at Stromboli, when a pyroclastic flow traveled for several hundreds of meters above the sea.

A pyroclastic flow can interact with a body of water to form a large amount of mud, which can then continue to flow downhill as a lahar. This is one of several mechanisms that can create a lahar.

On other celestial bodies
In 1963, NASA astronomer Winifred Cameron proposed that the lunar equivalent of terrestrial pyroclastic flows may have formed sinuous rilles on the Moon. In a lunar volcanic eruption, a pyroclastic cloud would follow local relief, resulting in an often sinuous track. The Moon's Schröter's Valley offers one example.
Some volcanoes on Mars, such as Tyrrhenus Mons and Hadriacus Mons, have produced layered deposits that appear to be more easily eroded than lava flows, suggesting that they were emplaced by pyroclastic flows.

See also
Pyroclastic fall
Pyroclastic rock
Welded tuff

References

 Sigurdson, Haraldur: Encyclopedia of volcanoes. Academic Press, 546–548. .

Notes

External links

 Pyroclastic Flows video

Volcanism